The East German Formula Three Championship was the Formula Three racing competition in East Germany.

History 
The series was created in 1950. Until 1958 engines' maximum capacity could not exceed 500ccm. Between 1960 and 1963 the championships were held  according to the rules of Formula Junior, then Formula Three. Since 1963 there were also Leistungsklasse II (LK II), which was the 2nd class of the series. In 1972 the series was replaced by East German Formula Easter Championship but that year there was organized the last LK II season.

Champions

References 

1950 establishments in East Germany
1972 disestablishments in East Germany
Formula Three series
Sport in East Germany